Giridih Coalfield is located in Giridih district in the Indian state of Jharkhand.

History
Coal mining activities were initiated in Giridih by private owners in 1857, making it the earliest coal mine in Bihar/Jharkhand. East Indian Railway started organised mining in 1896. The ownership of the coalfield was handed over to the state collieries in 1936 and then transferred to National Coal Development Corporation in 1956. Following nationalization of the coal industry it became a part of Coal India Limited in 1975.

Coalfield
It has 20 seams. Other important seams are Upper Karhabari and Bandhua seams. The reserves are estimated at around 17.3 million tonnes. The Giridih Coalfield is typical of Karhabari formation. It has low moisture (1.40-1.80%), low ash content (9-12.6%), low in sulphur (0.5%) and phosphorus (0.01%). The coalfield is located around Beniadih, in Giridih block, south of Giridih.

See also 
 Coal mining in India
 Coal India
 Bharat Coking Coal

References

Coalfields of India
Mining in Jharkhand
Giridih district